Blobs are sections of the visual cortex where groups of neurons that are sensitive to color assemble in cylindrical shapes. They were first identified in 1979 by Margaret Wong-Riley when she used a cytochrome oxidase stain, from which they get their name. These areas receive input from parvocellular cells in layer 4Cβ of the primary visual cortex and output to the thin stripes of area V2. Interblobs are areas between blobs which receive the same input, but are sensitive to orientation instead of color. They output to the pale and thick stripes of area V2.

Blobs are on the parvocellular pathway. This pathway begins at the photoreceptors which then relay signals to the 'P' ganglion cells in the retina. The pathway then continues out of the eye to layers 3-6 of the lateral geniculate nucleus (shortened to LGN). This pathway then terminates at the blobs in V1. Lesioning of the parvocellular pathway leads to lack of acuity in shapes and colour.

References 

Cerebrum
Visual system